Zamkova Hora may refer to:

 Zamkova Hora (Kyiv), a historical landmark in the center of Kyiv, Ukraine.
 Zamkova Hora (Lviv), a historic hill, on which a castle was once situated, in Lviv, Ukraine.

See also 
 Castle Mountain (disambiguation)